Kalateh-ye Azim (also Romanized as Kalāteh-ye ‘Az̧īm; also known as Kalāteh-ye Nowbahār) is a village in Dughayi Rural District, in the Central District of Quchan County, Razavi Khorasan Province, Iran. At the 2006 census, its population was 23, in 7 families.

References 

Populated places in Quchan County